Christopher Robert William Grigg (born February 2, 1953) is a Canadian former professional ice hockey goaltender.

Career 
During the 1975–76 season, Grigg played two games in the World Hockey Association with the Denver Spurs/Ottawa Civics. In the North American Hockey League, he played for the Long Island Cougars and Syracuse Blazers.

References

External links

1953 births
Living people
Canadian ice hockey goaltenders
Colgate Raiders men's ice hockey players
Denver Spurs players
Ice hockey people from Ontario
Sportspeople from Hamilton, Ontario
Long Island Cougars players
Ottawa Civics players
Syracuse Blazers players